Orchelimum nigripes, known generally as the black-legged meadow katydid or red-legged meadow grasshopper, is a species of meadow katydid in the family Tettigoniidae. It is found in North America.

References

External links

 

nigripes
Articles created by Qbugbot
Insects described in 1875